The Tunghsiao Power Plant or Tongxiao Power Plant is a gas-fired power plant in Tongxiao Township, Miaoli County, Taiwan. With the installed capacity of ca. 3.8 GW (1.815 GW before the 3 new units went online), the plant is Taiwan's second largest gas-fired power plant after Tatan Power Plant.

History
In the early 1960s,Taipower Company (TPC) was decided to set up a power plant in Tongxiao. Initially, Tongxiao Power Plant was fueled with diesel. In 1978, TPC rebuilt the power units with three combined cycle units (the fuel remained diesel, these units also called old #1~#3), they were the first combined cycle units in Taiwan. In 1990, TPC established #4 and #5 units, and #6 (fueled natural gas) was built in 1997. Later, TPC decided to renew old #1~#3 units (3 old units generate 763 MW electricity). The New Combined Cycle units started commercial operation on 27 February 2018 (New #1 Unit), 30 May 2019 (New #2 Unit), and 26 May 2020 (New #3 Unit). The new power units are established on the area of removed oil tanks.

On 30 May 2018, power outage occurred at the power plant at 3:12 p.m. due to the tripping of high voltage transmission line. A total of 70,391 households were left without power. The power was then restored at 4:38 p.m.

Technical description
The new power units have the electricity capacity 892.6 MW each (3 new units are 2677.8 MW), and its heat efficiency is 60.7%.

Tunghsiao Power Plant is accessible within walking distance West from Tongxiao Station of Taiwan Railways.

See also

 List of power stations in Taiwan
 List of natural gas power stations
 Electricity sector in Taiwan

References

1983 establishments in Taiwan
Buildings and structures in Miaoli County
Energy infrastructure completed in 1983
Natural gas-fired power stations in Taiwan
Oil-fired power stations in Taiwan